Taylor Riley Walker (born March 3, 1997) is an American snowboarder, better known by her childhood nickname Ty Walker.

Born in Smithtown, New York, and living in Stowe, Vermont, United States, she competed for United States at the 2014 Winter Olympics in Sochi. Later that year, Walker also won the first-ever World Cup for Women's Big Air snowboarding, an event that made its debut in the 2018 Winter Olympics. Taylor still holds the record as being the youngest Red Bull sponsored athlete in history. Walker entered Brown University in the fall of 2015 and graduated as a member of the class of 2020. During her time at Brown she studied biology with a focus on pre-medical studies.

References

External links
 Fis-Ski.com – Biography

1997 births
Living people
American female snowboarders
Snowboarders at the 2014 Winter Olympics
Olympic snowboarders of the United States
Sportspeople from Smithtown, New York
Sportspeople from Vermont
Brown University alumni
21st-century American women